Blastodacna atra, the apple pith moth is a moth of the family Elachistidae. It is known from most of Europe and it has been introduced to North America.

Description
The wingspan is 11–13 mm. The head is white. Forewings are narrow, dark fuscous; a broad white dorsal streak, sprinkled with dark fuscous from base to tornus, with broad triangular indentation at 2/5, including a black scale-tuft; from apex of this streak a slender whitish fascia to costa before apex, emitting a branch posteriorly in middle and sometimes one anteriorly below it; a black scale-tuft in disc before this. Hindwings are grey.

Adults are on wing from May to September in western Europe.

The larvae mine inside young shoots of apples (Malus species) and can be found by looking for small heaps of frass. Occasionally there may be a small swelling and the young shoot may die off.

Distribution
The apple pith moth is found in most of Europe. It is an introduced species in North America, where it has been recorded from Massachusetts and  Ontario.

References

Blastodacna
Gall-inducing insects
Leaf miners
Moths of Europe
Moths of North America
Moths described in 1828
Taxa named by Adrian Hardy Haworth